Judy Jordan (born 1961) is an American poet. Her honors include the Walt Whitman Award and the National Book Critics Circle Award.

Life
She grew up on a small farm near the Carolina border. 
Her parents were sharecroppers, and she was picking cotton by the time she was 5.  She was the first member of her family to attend college, with a Bachelor of Arts from the University of Virginia in 1990, and a Master of Fine Arts degree in 1995. She earned a Master of Fine Arts degree, in fiction from the University of Utah, in 2000. She lived in Salt Lake City.

She taught at the University of Virginia, Piedmont Virginia Community College, and California State University, San Marcos.  She teaches at Southern Illinois University Carbondale.

She lives off-the-grid in a cabin that she built herself in the Shawnee National Forest, and is working on a non-fiction book about her experiences there. She has a fourth book of poetry, Children of Salt, forthcoming and has recently completed a novel entitled Broken Days, Broken Hearts and is working on a memoir about her childhood.

Her poems have appeared in Raintaxi, Blue Pitcher Review, Crossroads: A Journal of Southern Culture, Lucid Oona, Poetry, Western Humanities Review, and Writer’s Eye.

Awards
 1999 Walt Whitman Award
 2000 National Book Critics Circle Award
 1996 Virginia Commission for the Arts Fellowship in Poetry,

Works
 "A Taste for Falling"; "In the 25th Year of My Mother's Death", National Public Radio

Poetry books

Anthologies

References

External links
 Nightlife, early 1990s (Volume 10, Issue 3)

1961 births
Living people
University of Virginia alumni
University of Utah alumni
University of Virginia faculty
Southern Illinois University Carbondale faculty
American women poets
21st-century American poets
American women academics
21st-century American women writers